Colima may be 

Tsafiki language 
Pasto language 
an unclassified language of South America#Colima